A Scout (in some countries a Boy Scout, Girl Scout, or Pathfinder) is a child, usually 10–18 years of age, participating in the worldwide Scouting movement. Because of the large age and development span, many Scouting associations have split this age group into a junior and a senior section. Scouts are organized into troops averaging 20–30 Scouts under the guidance of one or more Scout Leaders or Scoutmasters. Troops subdivide into patrols of about 6–8 Scouts and engage in outdoor and special interest activities. Troops may affiliate with local, national, and international organizations. Some national Scouting associations have special interest programs such as Air Scouts, Sea Scouts, outdoor high adventure, Scouting bands, and rider Scouts.

Foundation

After the Second Boer War boys showed considerable interest in Aids to Scouting, a book about military scouting and wilderness survival written by a hero from that war, Robert Baden-Powell. The book was also used by teachers and youth organizations for instruction and play. Inspired by that interest Baden-Powell wrote Scouting for Boys for boy readership, which describes the Scout method of outdoor activities aiming at developing character, citizenship training, and personal fitness qualities among youth.  At the time, Baden-Powell intended that the scheme would be used by established organizations, in particular the Boys' Brigade. However, because of the popularity of his person and the adventurous outdoor games he wrote about, boys spontaneously formed Scout patrols. 

Over time, the Scout programme has been reviewed and updated in many of the countries where it is run, and special interest programmes developed such as Air Scouts, Sea Scouts, outdoor high adventure, Scouting bands and rider Scouts, but the same core values and principles as Baden-Powell originally envisaged still apply.

Age groups and sections

Originally, the Scout program was aimed at 11- to 16-year-old boys. However, the younger brothers of Scouts started to attend Troop meetings, and so the Wolf Cub section was started. It was also evident that young girls wanted to participate in similar activities, but the Edwardian values at the time would not allow young boys and girls to "rough and tumble" together, causing the Guide Movement to be created.

While most Scouts may join a troop after finishing Cub Scouts, this is not required. As Scouts get older, they often seek more challenging and diverse activities. He may later join another affiliated program for older children, such as Exploring, Venturing, or Rovering.

Activities

A Scout learns the cornerstones of the Scout method, Scout Promise, and Scout Law. These are designed to instill character, citizenship, personal fitness, and leadership in boys through a structured program of outdoor activities. Common ways to implement the Scout method include spending time together in small groups with shared experiences, rituals, and activities, as well as emphasizing good citizenship and decision-making that are age-level appropriate. Cultivating a love and appreciation of the outdoors and outdoor activities are key elements. Primary activities include camping, woodcraft, first aid, aquatics, hiking, backpacking, and sports.

Fellowship
Camping most often occurs on a unit level, such as in the troop, but there are periodic camporees and jamborees. Camporees are events where units from a local area camp together for a weekend. These often occur a couple times a year and usually have a theme, such as pioneering. Jamborees are large events on a national or international level held every four years where thousands of Scouts camp together for one to two weeks. Activities at these events include games, Scoutcraft competitions, patch trading, aquatics, woodcarving, archery, and rifle and shotgun shooting.

For many Scouts, the highlight of the year is spending at least a week in the summer as part of an outdoor activity. This can be a long event such as camping, hiking, sailing, canoeing, or kayaking with the unit or a summer camp operated on a council, state, or provincial level. Scouts attending a summer camp, generally one week during the summer, work on merit badges, advancement, and perfecting Scoutcraft skills. Some summer camps operate specialty programs, such as sailing, backpacking, canoeing and whitewater, caving, and fishing.

Personal progression
A large part, compared to younger and older sections, of the activities are related to personal progression. All Scouting organizations have an advancement program, whereby the Scout learns Scoutcraft, community service, leadership, and explores areas of interest to him. This Badge system or Personal Progressive Scheme is based on two complementary elements:
 Proficiency (Merit) badges, which are intended to encourage the Scout to learn a subject which could be his work or hobby, so cover many different types of activities, not always related to Scouting.
 Class badges or Progress system, which symbolize increasingly difficult levels or successive stages.

Most Scouting associations have a highest badge that require mastering Scoutcraft, leadership, and performing community service. Only a small percentage of Scouts attain them.

Unit affiliation

Troop

The troop is the fundamental unit of the Scouts. This is the group a Scout joins and via which he participates in Scouting activities, such as camping, backpacking, and canoeing. The troop leadership, youth and adult, organizes and provides support for these activities. It may include as few as a half-dozen Scouts, or as many as seventy or more. Troops usually meet weekly.

Patrol
Each troop is divided into patrols of around five to ten Scouts. A patrol's independence from the troop varies among troops and between activities. For instance, a troop typically holds ordinary meetings as a unit. Patrols' autonomy becomes more visible at campouts, where each patrol may set up its own area for cooking and camping. However, on a high adventure trip which only a small part of the troop attends, divisions between patrols may disappear entirely. Patrols may hold meetings and even excursions separately from the rest of the troop, but this is more common in some troops than in others. Each patrol has a Patrol Leader (PL) and Patrol Second (PS), or Assistant Patrol Leader (APL). Some troops mix older and younger Scouts in the same patrols, so that the older Scouts can teach the younger ones more effectively, other troops group Scouts by age, so that the members of one patrol have more in common.

Group

In most countries a local organisation, a "Scout Group", combines different sections together into a single body. Scout Groups can consist of any number of sections of the different Age Groups in Scouting and Guiding. Scout Groups can be single sex or have boys and girls in separate and/or mixed-sex sections depending on the group and the national organization. In some countries, the different sections are independent of each other, although they might be sponsored or chartered by the same organisation, such as a church.

Uniforms

The Scout uniform is a specific characteristic of Scouting, and is worn at most events. The original uniform, which has created a familiar image in the public eye and had a very military appearance, consisted of a khaki button-up shirt, shorts, and a broad-brimmed campaign hat.

Uniforms have become much more functional and colorful since the beginning and are now frequently blue, orange, red, or green, and shorts are replaced by long trousers in areas where the culture calls for modesty, and in colder weather. T-shirts and other more casual wear have also replaced the more formal button-up uniforms in many Scouting regions. In some countries Scouts can display their various proficiency (merit) badges on their uniform, while in other countries they can display them on a green sash. 

To show the unity of all Scouts, the World Membership Badge (World Crest) or another badge with a fleur-de-lis is a part of all uniforms. Neckerchiefs and Woggles (slides) are still quite common, but some Scouting associations do not use them. Patches for leadership positions, ranks, special achievements, patrol- animals, colors or names, troop- or group- numbers or names, and country or regional affiliation are standard.

See also

Girl Guide and Girl Scout

External links

References

Scouting

ms:Pergerakan Pengakap
tl:Batang Iskawt
vi:Thiếu sinh Hướng đạo